Aaron or Arron Davies may refer to:

Aaron Michael Davies, American actor
Arron Davies, Welsh footballer
Aaron Davies (producer) of Dogstar (TV series)
Aaron Davies, character in Payback Season

See also
Aaron Davis (disambiguation)
Aaron Davey, Australian rules footballer